Licking Heights High School is a public high school in Pataskala, Ohio.  It is the only high school in the Licking Heights Local School District.

History
In November 2018, construction began on a new high school for the school district. What was the first high school building, initially built in 2003, became the new middle school, with the new high school finishing construction in August 2020.

Academics
The school provides approximately 10 AP courses, along with several Dual Enrollment courses through the Central Ohio Technical College, and other local colleges providing opportunities for higher level course credits (OU Pickerington, Columbus State). The first National Merit Finalist from Licking Heights High School earned that distinction in 2013.

Activities
 Quiz Bowl
 National Honor Society
 DECA 
 Various student organizations, including Drama Club and Chess Club
 Newspaper and Yearbook Organizations
 Environmental Club
 Annual musical production
 Choral program (including Advanced Choruses that travel biannually to NYC and an A capella Jazz Choir)
 Band

Marching Band
The Licking Heights Marching Band has 2 members as of 2015. The band is known for integrating their unique and engaging marching style with quality music. They have been a prominent fixture at the OMEA State Marching Band Finals, having earned a superior rating for the past 15 seasons. Currently, the LHMB is ranked at Class AA in OMEA standards, and achieves consistently high scores and placements at competition in their class.

Past shows Include:
Music of Billy Joel
Song of the Sirens
Castle On a Cloud
Three Wishes
Wicked
Vesuvius
UnBREAKable
One of THEM
Human After All
Queen Bee
River Songs

Videos of the Licking Heights Marching Band can be found on YouTube dating back to 1978.

The current staff of the LHMB includes: Meg Beavers (director), Doug Perry (assistant director and color guard director), Pamela Waits (assistant color guard director), and Shane Matthews (percussion director).

Licking Heights Youth Association, Inc.
The primary objective of the Licking Heights Youth Association is to promote youth athletics in the community by fostering growth and encouraging interest and participation.

Ohio High School Athletic Association State Championships

 Boys Wrestling – 1976, 1977, 1985
 Boys Track and Field – 1987

Notable alumni
Ronnie Dawson (2013), professional baseball outfielder for the Cincinnati Reds

References

External links
 District Website
 School Website
 Baseball-Softball Youth League
 

High schools in Licking County, Ohio
Public high schools in Ohio